Harrier Jump Jet, aka Jump Jet was a flight simulator published by MicroProse in 1992.

Reception
Computer Gaming World liked the flight model and "beautiful seamless graphics", but criticized the campaign mode as "old-fashioned ... no wingmen, no interaction with one's forces, no dynamic battlefield, no feeling of being involved ... a dressed up version of F-19". The magazine recommended Domark's AV-8B Harrier Assault instead.

References

External links
Harrier Jump Jet Information

1992 video games
DOS games
MicroProse games
Flight simulation video games
Video games developed in the United States
Video games scored by John Broomhall
Windows games
Harrier Jump Jet